Nicholay Finlayson (born 19 December 1985), also spelled as Nicholy Fin(d)layson; is a Jamaican footballer who currently plays for Waterhouse F.C. as a defender.

International career
Finlayson played his first international game with the senior national team in 2005, a match in which he was part of the starting squad and left the pitch after being substituted in the 52nd minute.

Honours
Waterhouse
JFF Champions Cup (1): 2013

References

External links
 

1985 births
Living people
Jamaican footballers
Jamaica international footballers
Association football defenders
Waterhouse F.C. players
2014 Caribbean Cup players
National Premier League players